The 22nd edition of the annual Hypo-Meeting took place on May 25 and May 26, 1996 in Götzis, Austria. The track and field competition featured a men's decathlon and a women's heptathlon. It was the last big test before the start of the 1996 Summer Olympics in Atlanta, Georgia.

Men's decathlon

Schedule

May 25

May 26

Records

Results

Women's heptathlon

Schedule

May 25

May 26

Records

Results

Notes

See also
1996 Decathlon Year Ranking
Athletics at the 1996 Summer Olympics – Men's decathlon
Athletics at the 1996 Summer Olympics – Women's heptathlon

References
 1996 Year Ranking Decathlon

1996
Hypo-Meeting
Hypo-Meeting